Grevillea angulata is a species of flowering plant in the family Proteaceae and is endemic to the Top End of the Northern Territory. It is a spreading to erect shrub with pinnatifid or toothed leaves and cream-coloured flowers.

Description

Taxonomy
Grevillea angulata was first formally described in 1830 by Robert Brown in his Supplementum primum prodromi florae Novae Hollandiae. The specific epithet (angulata) means "angular" or "angled".

Distribution and habitat
This grevillea grows in shrubland and woodland near creeks or in rocky places, sometimes near the coast, and is found in north-western Arnhem Land and on some nearby off-shore islands in the Top End of the Northern Territory.

References

Eudicots of Western Australia
angulata
Plants described in 1830
Taxa named by Robert Brown (botanist, born 1773)